The fourth season of Matlock originally aired in the United States on NBC with a two-hour season premiere from September 19, 1989, through May 8, 1990.

Cast

Main 
 Andy Griffith as Ben Matlock
 Nancy Stafford as Michelle Thomas
 Julie Sommars as ADA Julie March
 Clarence Gilyard as Conrad McMasters

Recurring 
 Kene Holliday as Tyler Hudson

Cast notes
Clarence Gilyard Jr. joined the cast this season
Kene Holliday was credited in "The Best Seller" and "The Witness" instead of Gilyard who didn't appear in those episodes.
Julie Sommars was absent for 17 episodes
Nancy Stafford was absent for 11 episodes
Clarence Gilyard Jr. was absent for 7 episodes

Episodes

References

External links 
 

1989 American television seasons
1990 American television seasons
04